Corallina elegans is a species of red algae in the family Corallinaceae from the Mediterranean Sea and the North Atlantic Ocean.

Another instance of the name, Corallina elegans Lenormand ex Areschoug, 1852 is accepted as Jania rubens var. corniculata (Linnaeus) Yendo, 1905.

References

External links 
 Corallina elegans at the World Register of Marine Species (WoRMS)
 

Corallinaceae
Species described in 1849